Wellington Luís Farias da Silva (born 4 January 1995) is a Brazilian footballer who plays as a goalkeeper for Spanish club UD Almería B. He previously played for Gil Vicente, Salgueiros and Marítimo.

References

External links

1995 births
Living people
Footballers from Porto Alegre
Brazilian footballers
Association football goalkeepers
Campeonato de Portugal (league) players
C.S. Marítimo players
Gil Vicente F.C. players
UD Almería B players
Brazilian expatriate footballers
Brazilian expatriate sportspeople in Portugal
Brazilian expatriate sportspeople in Spain
Expatriate footballers in Portugal
Expatriate footballers in Spain